The Tiflis uezd was a county (uezd) of the Tiflis Governorate of the Caucasus Viceroyalty of the Russian Empire, and then of Democratic Republic of Georgia, with its administrative centre in Tiflis (present-day Tbilisi). The area of the uezd roughly corresponded to the contemporary Kvemo Kartli region of Georgia. The district bordered the Telavi uezd to the northeast, the Tionety and Dusheti uezds to the north, the Gori uezd to the northwest, the Borchaly uezd to the west, the Kazakh uezd of the Elizavetpol Governorate to the south, and the Signakh uezd to the east.

History 
The Tiflis uezd as part of the Georgia Governorate was formed in 1801 as a result of the annexation of the Kingdom of Kartli-Kakhetian to the Russian Empire. In 1840, the district formed a part of the Georgia-Imeretia Governorate, then after 1846 it was included in the Tiflis Governorate until its abolition by Soviet authorities. In 1880, the Borchaly uezd was detached from the Tiflis uezd to be administered separately.

Following the Russian Revolution, the Tiflis uezd was incorporated into the short-lived Democratic Republic of Georgia.

Administrative divisions 
The subcounties (uchastoks) of the Tiflis uezd in 1913 were as follows:

Demographics

Russian Empire Census 
The plurality of the population indicated Georgian to be their mother tongue, with significant Armenian, Russian, and Tatar speaking minorities.

Kavkazskiy kalendar 

See also 
 History of the administrative division of Russia

Notes

References

Bibliography 

 

Caucasus Viceroyalty (1801–1917)
Tiflis Governorate
Uezds of Tiflis Governorate
Modern history of Georgia (country)
1880 establishments in the Russian Empire
States and territories established in 1880
States and territories disestablished in 1918